"Superman" is a song recorded by Australian country artist Keith Urban. The track was written by Urban with Craig Wiseman, and producers Ben Berger, Ryan Rabin, and Ryan McMahon of Captain Cuts. It was the fourth single released in Australia off Urban's eleventh studio album The Speed of Now Part 1, and the second single off the album released in the United Kingdom.

Background
Urban held a writing retreat in Nashville and he wanted to put together different writers that he knew who has never collaborated before. He elected to bring the three-man group Captain Cuts from Los Angeles and experienced country songwriter Craig Wiseman together and the group came up with "Superman" on their first day of writing. Urban said the song was written metaphorically, adding "I like when listeners can put their own story, their own faces and their own characters into the song, and this one to me, is definitely one of those songs".

Critical reception
Joseph Hudak of Rolling Stone noted influence of 1980s music in "Superman", saying Urban "embraces synth and drum machine, using both to zero in on his new sweet spot", referring to him as "Nashville’s preeminent summer-song creator". Chris Parton of Sounds Like Nashville described the song as "an instantly enjoyable foot-tapper full of much-needed positivity". Eric Alper called the song "infectious," and " brimming with energy and swagger".

Commercial performance
"Superman" reached a peak of number 10 on the TMN Country Hot 50 in Australia. It also reached peaks of number 16  on the Billboard Hot Canadian Digital Songs chart and number six on the US Country Digital Songs chart.

Music video
The official music video for "Superman" was directed by Ben Dalgleish and premiered on 17 July 2020. The video was filmed in a flip book style, with the animation portion of the video being drawn by Andymation. It was mostly filmed at Urban's warehouse in Nashville, Tennessee. He noted inspiration from the video for Norwegian synth-pop band A-ha's hit "Take On Me", which he called one of his "favourite videos of all time".

Track listings
Digital download – single
 "Superman" – 2:50
 "Polaroid" – 2:30
 "God Whispered Your Name" – 3:52

Credits
Adapted from The Speed of Now Part 1 liner notes.

Nathan Barlowe – keyboards
Ben Berger – bass guitar, keyboards, programming, background vocals
Nathan Chapman – bass guitar
Ryan McMahon – acoustic guitar, electric guitar, bass guitar, keyboards, programming, background vocals
Ryan Rabin – acoustic guitar, electric guitar, bass guitar, keyboards, programming, background vocals
Jerry Roe – drums
Keith Urban – acoustic guitar, electric guitar, keyboards, slide guitar, lead vocals, programming

Charts

Release history

References
 

2020 songs
2020 singles
Keith Urban songs
Songs written by Keith Urban
Songs written by Craig Wiseman